The equipment of the United States Navy have been subdivided into: watercraft, aircraft, munitions, vehicles, and small arms.

Surface ships
Commissioned surface ships and submarines (arranged by class and displacement)

Small boats

Submarines

Aircraft

Munitions

Land vehicles

In addition to the vehicles listed here, the Navy Seabees operate a number of unlisted trucks and construction vehicles.

Small arms

Individual equipment

See also

 Equipment of the United States Armed Forces
 Equipment of the United States Air Force
 Equipment of the United States Army
 Equipment of the United States Coast Guard
 Equipment of the United States Marine Corps
List of weapons of the United States Marine Corps
 List of active United States military aircraft

References

 

Equipment
United States Navy
Navy